Doe Creek Farm is a historic farm property at 412 Doe Creek Farm Road in rural Giles County, Virginia. The property is a mix of woodland, pasture, and apple orchards. The farm was established as an orchard and stock farm in 1883 by Samuel and Mollie Hoge, on a plantation estate that had been in his father's hands (whose estate house has not survived).
The farm was purchased from the Hoges in 1978 by William and Rosemary Freeman, and it is still owned and operated by Freeman family descendants.  The farm has continuously operated as an apple orchard and stock farm since its establishment.  The orchard was converted from a commercial to a U-Pick operation and the 1930s commercial packing house was converted to a wedding venue in 2013.

The farm was listed on the National Register of Historic Places in 2017.

See also
National Register of Historic Places listings in Giles County, Virginia

References

History museums in Virginia
Farms on the National Register of Historic Places in Virginia
Houses completed in 1885
Greek Revival architecture in Virginia
Houses in Giles County, Virginia
National Register of Historic Places in Giles County, Virginia
Historic districts in Virginia